The Harare Zimbabwe Temple is a temple of the Church of Jesus Christ of Latter-day Saints (LDS Church) under construction in Harare, Zimbabwe.

The intent to construct the temple was announced by church president Thomas S. Monson on April 3, 2016, during the Sunday morning session of the church's general conference.  The Quito Ecuador and Belém Brazil temples, along with a second temple in Lima, Peru, were announced at the same time. The church later announced the second temple in Peru would be named the Lima Peru Los Olivos Temple.

On December 12, 2020, a groundbreaking to signify beginning of construction was held, with Edward Dube of the Seventy, presiding. Emmerson Mnangagwa, the president of Zimbabwe, was also in attendance and spoke at the groundbreaking.  

This will be the church's first temple in Zimbabwe where the church reports there are approximately 26,000 members, as of April 2016.

See also

 Comparison of temples of The Church of Jesus Christ of Latter-day Saints
 List of temples of The Church of Jesus Christ of Latter-day Saints
 List of temples of The Church of Jesus Christ of Latter-day Saints by geographic region
 Temple architecture (Latter-day Saints)
 Religion in Zimbabwe

References

External links
Harare Zimbabwe Temple at ChurchofJesusChristTemples.org

Proposed religious buildings and structures of the Church of Jesus Christ of Latter-day Saints
21st-century Latter Day Saint temples
Temples (LDS Church) in Africa
Buildings and structures in Harare
Religious buildings and structures in Zimbabwe
The Church of Jesus Christ of Latter-day Saints in Zimbabwe
Proposed buildings and structures in Zimbabwe